USS Persistent (AM-491/MSO-491) was an Aggressive-class minesweeper acquired by the U.S. Navy for the task of removing mines that had been placed in the water to prevent the safe passage of ships.

The second ship to be named Persistent by the Navy, MSO–491 was laid down 17 June 1954 as AM491 by J.M. Martinac Shipbuilding Corp., Tacoma, Washington; reclassified MSO–491 on 7 February 1955; launched 23 April 1955; sponsored by Mrs. M.S. Erdahl; and commissioned 3 February 1956.

West Coast operations 

Following Pacific coast shakedown, Persistent reported for duty to Commander, Pacific Fleet, 2 March 1956 and was designated flagship for Mine Division 91 the same day. In September 1956, she was modified for advanced sound reduction to protect against acoustic mines.
 
In August 1957, she deployed to WestPac as part of Mine Countermeasures Group, U.S. 7th Fleet. After return to Long Beach, California, for regular overhaul in February 1958 and completion of type training that year, she engaged in research at the Navy Acoustic Range, Puget Sound, September 1959. Later that year she measured ocean currents under assignment to Scripps Institute of Oceanography.
 
After another deployment to WestPac in 1960, she returned to California in July. After type training in 1961, she deployed to WestPac in January 1962, assisting in the training of South Vietnamese sailors from January to August. After domestic operations in 1963, she deployed annually to WestPac from 1964 to 1970. She returned from her last WestPac early in 1971. Until 1971 she remained active with the U.S. Pacific Fleet.

Decommissioning 
Persistent was decommissioned on 1 July 1971 and struck from the Navy list on 1 August 1974. In 1974, she was sold to Spain, which named her Guadalquivir (M43).

References

External links 
 USS Persistent
 NavSource Online: Mine Warfare Vessel Photo Archive - Persistent (MSO-491) - ex-Persistent (AM 491)

 

Aggressive-class minesweepers
Ships built in Tacoma, Washington
1955 ships
Cold War minesweepers of the United States
Vietnam War minesweepers of the United States
Aggressive-class minesweepers of the Spanish Navy